Terence Baker (born 13 November 1965) is an English former footballer who played as a central defender in the Football League for Colchester United.

Career

Born in Rochford, Baker began his career with West Ham United, where he signed professional terms in 1983 following his apprenticeship. He failed to break into the first-team, joining Billericay Town on his release. Colchester United manager Cyril Lea resurrected his career in bringing Baker to Layer Road in November 1985. He got his first chance of first-team football in January 1986 when Keith Day dislocated his shoulder, as he went on to start in a 0–0 draw with Torquay United on 11 January.

Baker scored the first of his two league goals on 31 January in a 2–2 draw with Halifax Town at The Shay, ten days after scoring his first goal in a 2–1 Associate Members Cup defeat to Northampton Town. His second league goal came in a 2–1 away victory against Peterborough United on 31 March.

Baker found his chances harder to come by when manager Mike Walker brought in experienced former Arsenal player Colin Hill. He played his last game for Colchester on 2 January 1988 in a 2–0 defeat to Peterborough at London Road. Having made 55 appearances for the U's, Baker was released and returned to his former club Billericay Town.

References

1965 births
Living people
People from Rochford
English footballers
Association football defenders
West Ham United F.C. players
Billericay Town F.C. players
Colchester United F.C. players
English Football League players